Mazhar Abro (Sindhi: مظھر ابڙو) is a prominent short story writer, novelist, playwright and poet from Sindh, Pakistan.His literary appreciation began with the "Shah Abdul Lateef Bhitaai National Award" by Pakistan Academy of letters Islamabad.

Early life 
Mazhar Abro was born as Mazhar Hussain Abro according to Encyclopedia Sindhiana by Sindhi Language Authority he was born to Manzoor Hussain Abro on 25 April 1971 in village Kolab Jial of Khairpur District, Sindh, Pakistan.

Abro completed his early education at his village Kolab Jial, Khairpur and then his secondary education at Comprehensive High School, Khairpur. He affiliated himself with Pakistan Degree College, Khairpur for Graduation, and obtained a master's degree in Sindhi literature and economics from Shah Abdul Latif University Khairpur.

Contribution 
Mazhr Abro has authored seven books, one poetry collection, 4 books of Short stories and 2 Novels. By profession he is a professor of the College Education Department, Government of Sindh. He has granted many awards, including the National award from Pakistan Academy of Letters Islamabad.

Awards
In 1997, Abro won the Pakistan Academy of Letters Shah Abdul Latif Bhitai Award for best book in Sindhi literature for Khawab Khota Sika. Abro was honored on March 19, 2005.

Publications

Novels
 Jeevan Ujar Rasta (2000, Venggas Publication Khairpur)
 Khuwaban jo Safar (2009, Venggas Publication Khairpur)

Short stories
 Dharti Tay Wikhrial Tanda (1993, Preet Publication Khairpur)
 Khuwab Khota Sika (1998, Venggas Publication Khairpur)
 Sard Khanay Mein Rakhial Khuwab (2000, Venggas Publication Khairpur)
 Sukal Nadi ja Nishan (2020, Naun Niyapo Publication Karachi)

Poetry
 Dard Jay Aas Pas (2002, Venggas Publication Khairpur)

References

External links
Sindh Today

Literate, NOS, The News International

Pakistani novelists
Living people
Pakistani male short story writers
Pakistani short story writers
1971 births